Barbaria is a village in the Barasat I CD block in the Barasat Sadar subdivision of the North 24 Parganas district in the state of West Bengal, India. It is close to Kolkata and also a part of Kolkata Urban Agglomeration.

Geography

Location

Barbaria, Berunanpukuria, Jagannathpur, Kokapur and Chak Barbaria form a loose cluster of villages and census towns along State Highway 2 (locally known as Barasat-Barrackpore Road), close to Barasat.

Area overview
The area covered in the map alongside is largely a part of the north Bidyadhari Plain. located in the lower Ganges Delta. The country is flat. It is a little raised above flood level and the highest ground borders the river channels. 54.67% of the people of the densely populated area lives in the urban areas and 45.33% lives in the rural  areas.

Note: The map alongside presents some of the notable locations in the subdivision. All places marked in the map are linked in the larger full screen map.

Demographics
According to the 2011 Census of India, Barbaria had a total population of 4,764, of which 2,416 (51%) were males and 2,348 (49%) were females. Population in the age range 0–6 years was 454. The total number of literate persons in Barbaria was 3,649 (84.66% of the population over 6 years).

Transport
Barbaria is on State Highway 2 (locally known as Barasat-Barrackpore Road.

The nearest railway station is Barasat Junction railway station on the Sealdah-Bangaon line.

Education
Adamas Institute of Technology was established at Barbaria, PO Jagannathpur, in 2008-2009.

Adamas World School is a co-educational CBSE Board school at Adamas Knowledge City, PO Jagannathpur, having arrangements for teaching from Play class tp class X.

References

Villages in North 24 Parganas district